is a song recorded by Japanese singer Misia, from her ninth studio album, Just Ballade. It was released simultaneously with the album on December 16, 2009, through Ariola Japan. "Hoshi no Yō ni..." is the theme song to the kaiju film Mega Monster Battle: Ultra Galaxy.

Background and composition
"Hoshi no Yō ni..." was released merely a month after Misia's previous single, "Aitakute Ima", and is her first re-cut single. The song was written by Misia, composed by Sinkiroh and arranged by Tohru Shigemi. It is composed in the key of B minor and set to a common time tempo of 75 beats per minute. Misia's vocals span from A3 to C5 in modal voice, and to D5 in head voice. The song serves as theme song for the film Mega Monster Battle: Ultra Galaxy (2009). Misia's involvement with the Ultra Series came about in September 2009, when the main character, Ultraman, became a mascot for the Child Africa project of the non-profit organization Mudef, of which Misia is a board member.

The single includes a remix of "Hoshi no Yō ni...", of which an edited version is also featured on the film's soundtrack, that samples soundbytes of Ultraman's trademark "Shuwatch!" exclamations. The first pressing of the physical single came with a collector's figurine of Ultraman.

Critical reception
CDJournal critics noted that, despite the collaboration with Ultraman seeming "incompatible at first glance", Misia succeeds at creating a "fantastic and fascinating" theme song that does the character of Ultraman justice. They praised the song for "oozing pathos" and for "tugging at the heart" with its strings arrangement.

Music video
The music video for "Hoshi no Yō ni..." features the original Ultraman and several popular Ultra kaiju. It was directed by long-time collaborator Ukon Uemura and is the first music video produced by Tsuburaya Productions, the studio behind the Ultra Series.

Chart performance
"Hoshi no Yō ni..." entered the daily Oricon Singles Chart at number 9, where it also peaked. The single debuted at number 18 on the weekly Oricon Singles Chart, with 5,000 copies sold. It charted for four weeks and sold a reported total of 6,000 copies during its run.

Track listing

Credits and personnel
Personnel

 Lead vocals – Misia
 Songwriting – Misia, Sinkiroh
 Arrangement, piano – Tohru Shigemi
 Guitar – Masato Ishinari
 Strings – Gen Ittetsu Strings
 Engineering – Masahiro Kawaguchi, Ken Nishi
 Mixing – Shojiro Watanabe
 Mastering – Herb Powers Jr.

Charts

References

External links
 Hoshi no Yō ni...  Special Site

2009 singles
2009 songs
Misia songs
Ultra Series
Songs written by Misia
Ariola Japan singles